Country Airplay is a chart published weekly by Billboard magazine in the United States since October 20, 2012, although the magazine also retrospectively recognizes the Hot Country Songs charts from January 20, 1990 through October 13, 2012 as part of the history of the Country Airplay listing.  The chart lists the 60 most-listened-to records played on 150 mainstream country radio stations across the country as monitored by Nielsen BDS, weighted to each station's Nielsen ratings.

The first number-one song actually published under the Country Airplay banner was "Take a Little Ride" by Jason Aldean, but as Billboard also recognizes the history of the Hot Country Songs chart since 1990 as part of this chart the magazine recognizes the first chart-topper as "Nobody's Home" by Clint Black.  The current number-one song, as of the chart dated March 18, 2023, is "Going, Going, Gone" by Luke Combs.

History

Earlier versions

Throughout its history of ranking country songs by popularity, Billboard has had several different airplay-only charts to measure the top-played songs on radio stations. The first of these was called "Country & Western Records Most Played By Folk Disk Jockeys", and debuted with the December 10, 1949, issue. Like the other charts of the time, the number of positions was not standardized; the chart had anywhere from eight to 15 positions, varying from week to week. The chart, which had several other names, continued until October 13, 1958, when it was merged with the "best sellers" chart to become the Hot Country Songs chart.

Starting with the October 20, 1984 issue, there were separate charts for radio airplay and singles sales, similar to the Hot 100 Airplay and Singles Sales charts that also debuted with this issue, it was a component chart that helped determine placement on the Hot Country Singles chart.  The airplay chart was discontinued in 1987 as Hot Country songs became solely based on disc jockey reports, but the sales chart continued until 1989.

With effect from the issue dated January 20, 1990, the Hot Country Singles chart began to be based solely on country music radio airplay as opposed to a combination of airplay and physical sales.  At this time the chart consisted of 75 positions. Four weeks later, on February 17, the chart was retitled "Hot Country Singles & Tracks" to reflect the fact that songs which had not been released as singles could chart based on airplay. Beginning with the January 13, 2001, issue, the chart was cut from 75 to 60 positions, and effective April 30, 2005 the chart was renamed "Hot Country Songs".

Current chart
Beginning with the chart dated October 20, 2012, Billboard changed the methodology of Hot Country Songs to again incorporate sales and now also include streaming. In addition, the airplay component of the chart now factored in plays on stations of all genres instead of the previous genre-specific radio panel. At this point a second chart called Country Airplay was launched, based only on country radio airplay.  Billboard now recognizes the Hot Country Songs charts from January 20, 1990 until October 13, 2012 as part of the history of both listings.

Chart policies
As with most other Billboard charts, the Country Airplay chart features a rule for when a song enters recurrent rotation. Starting with the chart week of December 2, 2006, a song is declared recurrent on the country charts if it has been on the charts longer than 20 weeks; is not gaining in spins or audience impressions; and is lower than 10 in rank for either audience impressions or spins. Since December 2008, any song that is ranked below #10 in spins or audience and has not shown an increase in audience or spins for more than two weeks is also declared recurrent, even if it has not charted for 20 weeks.

Chart achievements
Chart achievements listed below cover Country Airplay since its launch in 2012 as well as Hot Country Songs since 1990.

Most weeks at number one

10 weeks
 "You Proof" – Morgan Wallen (2022–2023)
8 weeks
 "Amazed" – Lonestar (1999)
 "It's Five O'Clock Somewhere" – Alan Jackson and Jimmy Buffett (2003)
7 weeks
 "The Good Stuff" – Kenny Chesney (2002)
 "Have You Forgotten?" – Darryl Worley (2003)
 "There Goes My Life" – Kenny Chesney (2003–2004)
 "Live Like You Were Dying" – Tim McGraw (2004)
 "Beautiful Crazy" – Luke Combs (2019)
6 weeks
 "It's Your Love" – Tim McGraw with Faith Hill (1997)
 "Just to See You Smile" – Tim McGraw (1998)
 "How Forever Feels" – Kenny Chesney (1999)
 "Breathe" – Faith Hill (1999–2000)
 "Ain't Nothing 'bout You" – Brooks & Dunn (2001)
 "I'm Already There" – Lonestar (2001)
 "Somebody Like You" – Keith Urban (2002)
 "19 Somethin'" – Mark Wills (2003)
 "Beer for My Horses" – Toby Keith duet with Willie Nelson (2003)
 "As Good as I Once Was" – Toby Keith (2005)
 "Better Life" – Keith Urban (2005)
 "Jesus, Take the Wheel" – Carrie Underwood (2006)
 "Our Song" – Taylor Swift (2007–2008)
 "Die a Happy Man" – Thomas Rhett (2016)
 "Forever After All" – Luke Combs (2021)
 "Thinking 'Bout You" – Dustin Lynch featuring MacKenzie Porter (2021–2022)
Sources:

Most number-ones

Most number-ones by female artists

Most number-ones by duos or groups

Most top 10 entries

Most top 10 entries by women

Most entries

See also
List of years in country music

References

External links
Billboard Country Airplay chart – online version.

American country music
Billboard charts